Sigma Psi is local sorority founded at Case Western Reserve University, in Cleveland, Ohio on March 7, 1897. Sigma Psi is the oldest sorority on Case Western Reserve University's campus, and one of the oldest local sororities in the United States.

Sigma Psi's values are Sincerity, Faithfulness, and Fidelity.

History 
The first sororities at Western Reserve University began as Greek study groups with a focus on self-improvement. On March 7, 1897, one woman broke from one of these unlettered Greek groups and she and four of her friends decided to form their own group, Sigma Psi Women's Fraternity, "for the intellectual and social benefits of its members." These women were Elsie Davies, Cornelia Olmstead, Grace Lottridge, Edith Lottridge, and Anna Camp. The first pledge class was composed of these five, plus Mary Case, Clare Metcalf, and Elizabeth Coit. All eight women are considered to be founding members of the fraternity.

In 1997, Sigma Psi celebrated its centennial anniversary. A community-wide celebration was held, with alumni from across the country in attendance. The Sigma Psi common room contains an American flag that was flown over the United States Capitol by former Senator Louis Stokes in honor of the centennial, as well as a letter from then-President Bill Clinton congratulating the sorority on its accomplishment.

In 2015, the sorority amended membership bylaws to allow non-binary individuals.

Symbols 
Sigma Psi's colors are green and gold. The official flowers of Sigma Psi are the daffodil and the yellow rose, and the official symbol is the butterfly. Sigma Psi's official gemstones are emeralds and pearls, which edge the formal badge.

The crest is a black triangle edged with gold and emblazoned with the Greek letters, surrounded by several golden wreaths. The badge is a simple black triangle featuring the Greek letters ΣΨ and edged with gold. This badge is given to all active sisters upon initiation.

Philanthropy 
Sigma Psi has supported a variety of philanthropies throughout its history, but beginning in 2020, Sigma Psi supports the Cleveland Metroparks, a local organization consisting of eighteen reservations, 24,000 acres with more than 300 miles of trails, and a zoo.

References

External links 
 

Fraternities and sororities in the United States
Case Western Reserve University
Sororities